The 2009 Valencian GP2 round was the seventh round of the 2009 GP2 Series season. It was held on August 22 and 23, 2009 at Valencia Street Circuit at Valencia, Spain. The race was used as a support race to the 2009 European Grand Prix. Last year's race was quite eventful, with championship frontrunners Giorgio Pantano and Bruno Senna retiring on the last lap, with Senna retiring just before the finish line. Past Winners include last year's Campos duo Vitaly Petrov and Lucas di Grassi, who both competed this year. This race saw a driver reshuffle with Davide Valsecchi moving to Barwa Addax Team in place of Romain Grosjean who now races in F1. Formula Three Euroseries Race Winner Stefano Coletti replaces Valsecchi at Durango. The round also saw the departure of FMS, who sold their stake back to Scuderia Coloni.

Standings after the round 

Drivers' Championship standings

Teams' Championship standings

 Note: Only the top five positions are included for both sets of standings.

External links
http://www.gp2series.com/en//website/2009gp2series/season/races/spain_valencia/
http://www.autosport.com/news/report.php/id/77884
http://www.autosport.com/news/report.php/id/77914

Valencia
Valencia GP2